Chastoozersky District is an administrative and municipal district (raion), one of the twenty-four in Kurgan Oblast, Russia. It is located in the east of the oblast. Its administrative center is the rural locality (a selo) of Chastoozerye. Population:  7,762 (2002 Census);  The population of Chastoozerye accounts for 46.4% of the district's total population.

References

Notes

Sources

Districts of Kurgan Oblast